The Stepford Wives is a 1975 American satirical psychological thriller film directed by Bryan Forbes. It was written by William Goldman, who based his screenplay on Ira Levin's 1972 novel of the same name. The film stars Katharine Ross as a woman who relocates with her husband (Peter Masterson) and children from New York City to the Connecticut community of Stepford, where she comes to find the women live unwaveringly subservient lives to their husbands.

Filmed in Connecticut in 1974, The Stepford Wives premiered theatrically in February 1975. It grossed $4 million at the U.S. box office, though it received mixed reviews from critics. Reaction from feminist activists was also divided at the time of its release; Betty Friedan dismissed it as a "rip-off of the women's movement" and discouraged women from seeing it, though others such as Gael Greene and Eleanor Perry defended the film. 

The Stepford Wives has grown in stature as a cult film over the years, and the term Stepford or Stepford wife has become a popular science fiction concept. Several sequels to the film were made, as well as a big-budget remake in 2004 that used the same title.

Plot
Joanna Eberhart is a young wife and aspiring photographer who moves with her husband Walter and their two daughters from Manhattan to Stepford, Connecticut. She finds that the women in town all look flawless and are obsessed with housework, but lack intellectual interests. The men all belong to the exclusionary Men's Association, which Walter joins to Joanna's dismay. Joanna is also bewildered by her neighbor Carol Van Sant's sexual submissiveness to her husband Ted, and her odd, repetitive behavior after a car accident.

Joanna subsequently befriends Bobbie Markowe, with whom she finds common interests and shared ideas. Along with trophy wife Charmaine Wimperis, the three organize a women's liberation meeting, but the gathering is a failure when the other wives continually divert the discussion to cleaning products. Joanna is also unimpressed by the boorish Men's Association members, including the intimidating president Dale “Diz” Coba. Stealthily, the Men's Association collects information on Joanna including her picture, her voice, and other personal details. When Charmaine returns from a weekend trip with her husband as a devoted wife who has fired her maid and destroyed her tennis court, Joanna and Bobbie start investigating, with ever-increasing concern, the reason behind the submissive and bland behavior of the other wives. Their fear reaches its pinnacle when they discover that all the women were once strong, assertive, independent, and staunch advocates of liberal social policies. Bobbie speculates that industries in or nearby Stepford are contaminating the local water to make the women submissive, which is later disproven.

Bobbie and Joanna start house hunting in other towns. Later, Joanna wins a prestigious contract with a photo gallery. When she goes to tell Bobbie, Joanna is shocked to find that the former has abruptly become another clean conformist housewife with no intention of moving. She panics and visits a psychiatrist, to whom she voices her belief that the men in the town are in a conspiracy that involves altering the psyches of the women. The psychiatrist recommends that she leave town until she feels safe. After leaving the psychiatrist's office, Joanna returns home to pick up her children only to find out that her children are missing and Walter is evasive about their whereabouts. The two get in a physical scuffle when she refuses her husband’s demands to lie down in her bed. Joanna locks herself in the bedroom, then sneaks out to Bobbie's house after Walter leaves her alone, but grows frustrated when Bobbie refuses to engage with her in a meaningful way. Desperate and disturbed, Joanna cuts her hand before stabbing Bobbie with a kitchen knife. Bobbie does not bleed, but instead malfunctions, revealing that the real Bobbie has been replaced by a robot.

Joanna later returns home and bludgeons Walter with a firepoker, demanding to know where their children were taken. He tells Joanna that the kids are at the Men's Association, after which Walter loses consciousness. Despite sensing that she will be the latest victim, Joanna sneaks into the mansion that houses the Men's Association, in hopes of finding her children. However, she is confronted by Coba, the operation’s mastermind. Coba tells Joanna that her children are really with Charmaine. He remotely locks the front door and asks her if she desires a flawless husband, explaining that the men of Stepford replace their wives because they "can", and that it's "perfect" for both the husband and the wife. Dale then takes the poker away from her, at which point she screams and flees, eventually coming upon her own active but unfinished robot replica. Joanna is shocked into near paralysis when she witnesses its black, empty eyes. The Joanna-replica smiles as it brandishes a nylon stocking and calmly approaches Joanna to strangle her as Dale looks on.

Some time later, the artificial Joanna placidly peruses the local supermarket amongst the other glamorously dressed wives. As they make their way through the store, they each vacantly greet one another. During the end credits, photographs show a smiling Walter driving the family car and picking up his new "Stepford Wife" from the supermarket with their children in the backseat.

Cast

Analysis
Film scholar John Kenneth Muir interprets The Stepford Wives as "a film essay about what it means to be part of an unspoken 'underclass.'"

Production

Development
Producer Edgar Scherick recruited English director Bryan Forbes to direct the film.  Brian De Palma was initially going to direct but William Goldman didn’t want him to.

Casting
For the lead role of Joanna Eberhart, Forbes initially met with Diane Keaton, whom he said turned it down because her analyst did not like the script. Jean Seberg declined the part; Tuesday Weld initially accepted but cancelled before filming began. The part eventually went to Katharine Ross.

Joanna Cassidy was cast as Joanna's friend and ally Bobbie but was fired after a few weeks of production and replaced by Paula Prentiss.

Mary Stuart Masterson (daughter of Peter Masterson), Dee Wallace and Franklin Cover appear in supporting roles. Tina Louise - the original Ginger Grant from Gilligan's Island- was cast as a 'wife' along with her TV character's replacement Judith Baldwin.

For the role of Carol Van Sant, Forbes cast his wife, Nanette Newman.

Filming
Scheduling difficulties delayed the filming from 1973 until 1974.

No exterior sets were built for the film, which was shot on location in several Connecticut towns. The climax was filmed at the Lockwood-Mathews Mansion in Norwalk. Forbes purposefully chose white and bright colors, attempting to make a "thriller in sunlight". With the exception of the stormy night finale, it is almost over-saturated to emphasize bright lights and cheerful-looking settings.

Tension developed between Forbes and screenwriter Goldman over the casting of Nanette Newman (Forbes' wife) as one of the wives. Goldman felt that the 40 year old Newman's appearance did not match the young provocatively-dressed model-like women he'd scripted for. Forbes responded by instituting contemporary prairie-style dress, complete with frilly aprons, for all the wives. Goldman was also unhappy with re-writes by Forbes - in particular, the ending - which Nanette Newman claimed Forbes had deliberately filmed "in an unreal way, so they were almost like a ballet moving in and out, up and down the aisle." Additional stresses were caused when
actor Peter Masterson secretly called his friend Goldman for input on scenes. Goldman later claimed the film "could have been very strong, but it was rewritten and altered, and I don't think happily."

Release

Box office
The Stepford Wives premiered theatrically in the United States on February 12, 1975.  The film grossed approximately $4 million in North America.

Critical response
The Stepford Wives has a rating of 68% on Rotten Tomatoes, based on 34 reviews, with an average rating of 6.2/10. The site's consensus states: "The Stepford Wivess inherent satire is ill-served by Bryan Forbes' stately direction, but William Goldman's script excels as a damning critique of a misogynistic society." Some critics deride its leisurely pace. Most applaud the "quiet, domestic" thrills the film delivers in the final third and earlier sections as "clever, witty, and delightfully offbeat". As for the satire in the film, Roger Ebert wrote "[The actresses] have absorbed enough TV, or have such an instinctive feeling for those phony, perfect women in the ads, that they manage all by themselves to bring a certain comic edge to their cooking, their cleaning, their gossiping and their living deaths."

Jerry Oster of the New York Daily News awarded the film a middling two out of four stars, describing the screenplay as a "tedious" and "padded" adaptation of the source material.

Variety summarized the film as "a quietly freaky suspense-horror story" and praised Ross's performance as "excellent and assured." John Seymour of the Santa Maria Times also gave the film a favorable review, deeming it an "epic nightmare" boasting "gripping drama."

Devan Coggan of Entertainment Weekly wrote that the finale was "deeply divisive" and the actress for Joanna stated retrospectively that if she was to revise the ending she would have Joanna "fight harder".

Reaction from feminists

Initial reaction to the film by feminist groups was not favorable, with one studio screening for feminist activists being met with "hisses, groans, and guffaws." Cast and crew disagreed with the perceived anti-woman interpretations, with Newman recalling "Bryan [Forbes] always used to say, ‘If anything, it’s anti-men!'" Despite Betty Friedan's The Feminine Mystique being a major influence on the original novel upon which the film was based, Friedan's response to the film was highly critical, calling it "a rip-off of the women's movement." Friedan commented that women should boycott the film and attempt to diminish any publicity for it.

Writer Gael Greene, however, lauded the film, commenting: "I loved it—those men were like a lot of men I've known in my life." Feminist screenwriter Eleanor Perry came to the film's defense, stating that it "presses buttons that make you furious—the fact that all the Stepford men wanted were big breasts, big bottoms, a clean house, fresh-perked coffee and sex."

Accolades

Home media
Anchor Bay Entertainment issued The Stepford Wives on VHS on March 10, 1997; they subsequently released a non-anamorphic DVD edition on December 3, 1997. In 2001, Anchor Bay reissued the film in a "Silver Anniversary" edition, featuring an anamorphic transfer as well as bonus interviews with cast and crew. In 2004, Paramount Home Entertainment re-released the "Silver Anniversary" edition, which featured the same bonus materials and screen menus.

Legacy
Film scholar John Kenneth Muir considers The Stepford Wives one of the best horror films of the 1970s. In a writer's roundtable with The Hollywood Reporter, Jordan Peele listed the film as one of the inspirations behind his directorial debut Get Out.

A line delivered by Paula Prentiss, as Bobby Markowe, after becoming a Stepford Wife; "Yes.. this.. it's wonderful!", was legally sampled on the song, "Hey Music Lover", by British dance act, S-Express, becoming a big international hit in 1989.

The film influenced the development of the character Bree Van de Kamp in the successful series, Desperate Housewives (2004–12), played by Marcia Cross. The character was often referred to as a "Stepford Wife" by other characters, due to her somewhat uptight personality, immaculately presented home, beautifully pruned red roses, and her love of baking cakes. She also dressed in a Midwestern, traditional style, echoing, but modernizing, the look of the original "Stepford Wives", as seen in the film.

Related works
 Revenge of the Stepford Wives (1980, TV), starring Don Johnson, Sharon Gless and Julie Kavner
 The Stepford Children (1987, TV), starring Barbara Eden and Don Murray
 The Stepford Husbands (1996, TV), starring Donna Mills and Michael Ontkean
 The Stepford Wives (2004, film), starring Nicole Kidman, Glenn Close, Bette Midler and Matthew Broderick

See also
 List of American films of 1975

References

Sources

External links

 
 
 
 
 

1975 films
1975 horror films
1970s American films
1970s English-language films
1970s feminist films
1970s horror thriller films
1970s psychological horror films
1970s psychological thriller films
1970s satirical films
1970s science fiction horror films
1970s science fiction thriller films
American feminist films
American horror thriller films
American psychological horror films
American psychological thriller films
American robot films
American satirical films
American science fiction horror films
American science fiction thriller films
Android (robot) films
Columbia Pictures films
Films based on American horror novels
Films based on science fiction novels
Films based on works by Ira Levin
Films directed by Bryan Forbes
Films scored by Michael Small
Films set in Connecticut
Films shot in Connecticut
Films shot in New York City
Films with screenplays by William Goldman
Mannequins in films